Bedeutung was a magazine of philosophy, current affairs, art and literature published in the UK. The name 'bedeutung' comes from the German word which means 'meaning'.

Publication
Bedeutung  was started in May 2007 and was intended as a quarterly. It featured a number of essays by prominent philosophers, sociologists, authors, public intellectuals, thinkers, artists and curators on a range of topics that are overarched by a general theme that runs through the whole issue. Issue 1 was on the distinction between Nature & Culture. It was suggested that the magazine should be read in the sequence that it is printed, as its structure gradually moves from abstract philosophical ('Philosophy' section) to more concrete and "journalistic" type of articles ('Current Affairs' section) leading, eventually, to the 'Art' section and closing with the 'Literature' section.

The issue of the magazine themed "Human & Divine" featured articles by the Archbishop of Canterbury, Rowan Williams, LSE political philosopher, John Gray, renowned atheist philosopher, A. C. Grayling, LSE social scientist Nicos Mouzelis, an interview with anti-religion crusader Michel Onfray and features the Austrian actionist artist Hermann Nitsch, British artist Becky Beasley, Miuccia Prada protégé Martino Gamper and Warren Neidich. It also includes a piece by author Sarah Wood. The back cover features an extract by Italian philosopher Giorgio Agamben. According to the editorial, the second issue of the magazine sets out to defend the view that our idea of secularism bears significant conceptual resemblances with religious belief, in that it is based in faith, rather than objective knowledge.

The third issue of Bedeutung appeared in 2010 and was themed "Life & Death". It appears there have been no further issues.

Notable contributors, interviewees and artists featured

Slavoj Žižek
Cornelius Castoriadis
Nick Davies
Martin Durkin
Okwui Enwezor
David Goldblatt
Guy Tillim
Apostolos Doxiadis
Michel Onfray
John Gray
Rowan Williams
A. C. Grayling
Hermann Nitsch
Giorgio Agamben

Editorial
Alex Stavrakas (Editor-in-Chief and Creative Director)
Michael Withey (Editor)
Thomas Presskorn (Editor)
John Slyce (Art Editor)

References

External links

Guardian Review

2007 establishments in the United Kingdom
Visual arts magazines published in the United Kingdom
Literary magazines published in the United Kingdom
Quarterly magazines published in the United Kingdom
Magazines established in 2007
Philosophy magazines